Westwood/VA Hospital Station is a planned heavy-rail subway station on the D Line (Purple) of the Los Angeles County Metro Rail system. The station will be located underground between Bonsall Avenue and the I-405 freeway, south of Wilshire Blvd. The main station entrance will be located south of Wilshire Blvd, next to Bonsall Avenue, directly serving the VA Medical Center. Another entrance will be located north of Wilshire Blvd.

The station is currently in the under construction phase 3 of the Purple Line Extension project, with contractors hired in 2019. The station is slated to open along with Westwood/UCLA station in 2027.

Attractions 
 West Los Angeles VA Medical Center
 Sawtelle Japantown 
 San Vicente Boulevard in Brentwood.
 Wadsworth Chapel
 Wadsworth Theater
 Streetcar Depot, West Los Angeles
 Los Angeles National Cemetery
 Wilshire Federal Building
 Jackie Robinson Stadium
 Tongva Sacred Springs
 Bad News Bears Field (park)

References

External links 
 Metro Los Angeles - Purple Line Extension

Future Los Angeles Metro Rail stations
Railway stations scheduled to open in 2027